LSP2-9166 is a drug which acts as a selective agonist for the group III metabotropic glutamate receptors, with a reasonably potent EC50 of 70nM at mGluR4 and 220nM at mGluR7, and weaker activity of 1380nM at mGluR6 and 4800nM at mGluR8. It has anticonvulsant effects in animal studies, and reduces self-administration of various addictive drugs.

References 

MGlu4 receptor agonists
MGlu7 receptor agonists
Trifluoromethyl ethers
Dicarboxylic acids
Amino acids
Phosphinates